is a professional Go player. Yamashita adopted the name Honinbo Dowa after winning his first Honinbo title in 2010.

Biography
A student of Yasuro Kikuchi, Yamashita turned professional in 1993. He won the 19th Kisei 2 dan division in 1994. Yamashita reached the challenger finals of the Tengen in 1999. His first major title came in 2000 when he defeated Honorary Gosei Koichi Kobayashi in the finals of the 25th Gosei. At the time of his win, Yamashita was the second youngest player to win a major title. He also won the Shusai Prize for his play and broke the record for most games in a year with 77. Yamashita defeated O Rissei for the Kisei in 2003, becoming the fourth youngest big-three (Kisei, Meijin, Honinbo) winner at 24.

Promotion record

Career record
1993: 21–7
1999: 55–12
2000: 58–17
2001: 50–19
2004: 39–32
2005: 33–20
2006: 44–24
2007: 32–25
2008: 27–24
2009: 38–17
2010: 40–23
2011: 32–20

Titles and runners-up

References

External links
Nihon Ki-in profile (in Japanese)

Japanese Go players
People from Asahikawa
Sportspeople from Tokyo
1978 births
Living people
Asian Games medalists in go
Go players at the 2010 Asian Games
Asian Games bronze medalists for Japan
Medalists at the 2010 Asian Games